Ushachy is a town, the capital of the Ushachy Raion, Vitsebsk Voblast, Belarus.

History
In 1939, 487 Jews lived in the town, making up 23.8% of the total population. The city was under German occupation from 1941 to 1944.
A ghetto fenced with barbed wire was established in Ushachi in October 1941. The Ushachi Jews in the ghetto were murdered on January 12, 1942, in pits dug in advance by local residents near the cemetery.  Before the liquidation, some Jews managed to set fire to the ghetto and to escape. Some days later, the Jews of Kublichi were killed at the same pits where Ushachi Jews were killed.

References

External links
 

Urban-type settlements in Belarus
Vitebsk Region